Kenneth Cheng Man Kit (born 7 April 1988) is a Hong Kong equestrian. He competed in two events at the 2008 Summer Olympics.

References

External links
 

1988 births
Living people
Hong Kong male equestrians
Olympic equestrians of Hong Kong
Equestrians at the 2008 Summer Olympics
Asian Games medalists in equestrian
Equestrians at the 2006 Asian Games
Equestrians at the 2010 Asian Games
Equestrians at the 2014 Asian Games
Asian Games bronze medalists for Hong Kong
Medalists at the 2010 Asian Games
21st-century Hong Kong people